NH 156 may refer to:

 National Highway 156 (India)
 New Hampshire Route 156, United States